The list of ship launches in 1940 includes a chronological list of some ships launched in 1940.


References

Sources

1940
Ship launches